Copa do Nordeste (Cup of the North-East), also known as Campeonato do Nordeste (Championship of the North-East) or Copa Nordeste (Northeastern Cup), and sometimes informally referred as Lampions League – in reference to the UEFA Champions League and bandit Lampião, is a Brazilian football competition among Northeastern region teams.

History
The competition was first played in 1976, as Torneio José Américo de Almeida Filho. It was played, as Campeonato do Nordeste for first time, in 1994. From 1997 to 1999, the Campeonato do Nordeste champions granted qualification to Copa Conmebol.

From 2000 to 2002, the Campeonato do Nordeste champions granted qualification to the Copa dos Campeões.

The competition returned in 2010, after being defunct since 2003. Copa do Nordeste returned again in 2013.

From 2014 to 2016, the winner got a spot in the Copa Sudamericana. The Copa do Nordeste champion now qualifies to the Copa do Brasil.

Competition format
Since 2018 a qualifying tournament called Pré-Copa do Nordeste has been played. In this tournament, eight teams compete in a single-elimination tournament where the four winners advance to the Copa do Nordeste.

The Copa do Nordeste has in its first stage two groups. 12 teams gain direct entries into the group stage while the other four berths are decided by the Pré-Copa do Nordeste.

In the group stage, each group is played on a single round-robin basis against the eight clubs from the other group. The top four teams of each group advance to the quarter-finals.

The quarter-finals, semi-finals and finals are played a single-elimination tournament. Only the finals are played on a home-and-away two-legged basis, with the best tournament team hosting the second leg, while quarter-finals and semi-finals are played on a single-leg basis, with the higher-seeded team hosting the leg.

List of champions

Performances

By club

By state

References

External links
RSSSF

 
Nordeste
Recurring sporting events established in 1976